Ye Olde Minstrels is a 1941 Our Gang short comedy film directed by Edward Cahn.  It was the 197th Our Gang short (198th episode, 109th talking short, 110th talking episode, and 29th MGM produced episode) that was released.

Premise
To raise money for the local chapter of the Red Cross, the gang stages an old-fashioned minstrel show with the help of Froggy's uncle, played by real-life minstrel man Walter Wills. The show is a success, netting the Red Cross a munificent $208.40.

Cast

The Gang
 Mickey Gubitosi (later known as Robert Blake) as Mickey
 Darla Hood as Darla
 Billy Laughlin as Froggy
 George McFarland as Spanky
 Billie Thomas as Buckwheat

Additional cast
 Minstrel Maestro Walter Wills as himself
 Giovanna Gubitosi as Audience extra
 Tommy McFarland as Audience extra

Additional performers
Bobby Browning, Raphael Dolciame, Ralph Hodges, Dickie Humphries, Joline Karol, Valerie Lee, Priscilla Montgomery, David Polonsky, Jackie Salling

See also
 Our Gang filmography

References

External links

1941 films
1941 comedy films
American black-and-white films
Films directed by Edward L. Cahn
Metro-Goldwyn-Mayer short films
Our Gang films
1941 short films
1940s American films
1940s English-language films